George McGeachie (born 5 February 1959 in Falkirk) is a Scottish former footballer who played as a defender. McGeachie spent the majority of his career with Dundee, playing for thirteen seasons at Dens Park and making nearly 250 league appearances, including winning the 1978–79 Scottish First Division. In 1990, McGeachie moved down the east coast to play for Raith Rovers, spending four years with the Kirkcaldy club and winning the First Division again in 1992–93. A three-year spell with Stenhousemuir – including winning the Scottish Challenge Cup in 1995–96 – was McGeachie's final period in senior football before retiring in 1997.

Honours

Dundee
Scottish First Division: 1
 1978–79
Scottish League Cup Runner-up: 1
 1980–81

Raith Rovers
Scottish First Division: 1
 1992–93

Stenhousemuir
Scottish Challenge Cup: 1
 1995–96

References

External links

1959 births
Footballers from Falkirk
Living people
Dundee F.C. players
Raith Rovers F.C. players
Stenhousemuir F.C. players
Scottish footballers
Scottish Football League players
Association football defenders